U.S. Highway 212 (US 212) within the state of Minnesota travels from the South Dakota state line in the west, crosses the southwestern part of the state, to the Minneapolis–Saint Paul metropolitan area in the east and end at its interchange with US 169 and State Highway 62 (MN 62) in the Minneapolis suburb of Edina. It is an urban freeway within the Minneapolis–Saint Paul area and is mostly a two-lane rural road elsewhere in the state.

Prior to the establishment of the United States Numbered Highway System, most of the US 212 corridor in Minnesota was part the transcontinental auto trail known as the Yellowstone Trail, which was established in 1917. US 212 was established in 1926 but originally terminated at US 12 in the city of Willmar from 1926 to 1934. US 212 was shifted to its current alignment around 1934, continuing slightly east of its current terminus to end at then US 12 in Saint Paul until 1982, when US 212 was truncated to Edina. In 2008, the Twin Cities portion of US 212 was relocated to a new freeway (formerly designated as State Highway 312 from 2003 to 2008).

US 212 in Minnesota did not terminate at its eastern point at MN 62 in Edina. It continued easterly through St. Paul, through Lake Elmo and terminated in Stillwater near the Wisconsin state line.

Route description
US 212 in Minnesota passes through seven counties in the southern part of the state, from the South Dakota state line to the Twin Cities area. It runs in straight east–west course from the South Dakota line across prairie land to the city of Montevideo. From there the route follows the valley of the Minnesota River to Granite Falls. It then leaves the Minnesota River valley to pass through farming areas until Glencoe, where the terrain gradually becomes more hilly as the road continues east. As the route approaches the Twin Cities, the road becomes a freeway running parallel to, but not within, the Minnesota River valley. US 212 ends at the junction of US 169 and MN 62 in the Minneapolis suburb of Edina.

The entire length of US 212 in Minnesota is officially designated the Minnesota Veterans Memorial Highway. Legally, the Minnesota section of US 212 is defined as Legislative Routes 155, 12, 187, and 260 in the Minnesota Statutes. The route is not marked with those numbers.

South Dakota to Granite Falls
US 212 crosses into Minnesota from South Dakota, traveling through flat, open terrain. About  from the state line, it intersects US 75, then enters the small city of Dawson several miles later. US 212 continues past Dawson through more fertile prairie land, eventually being joined by US 59. The overlapped routes pass by the entrance to Camp Release State Park, a  park where the former Sioux village of Chief Red Iron was located, and which also contains a  granite monument commemorating the release of 269 prisoners from Sioux captivity. US 212 and US 59 split in the western edge of the city of Montevideo in the valley of the Minnesota River; US 59 heads northwest, and US 212 heads southeast. In the center of the city, MN 23 joins US 212 briefly as they cross the Minnesota River; the two routes split soon after leaving the eastern city limits.

Granite Falls to Glencoe
East of Granite Falls, US 212 leaves the Minnesota River valley, heading due east across a variety of farming areas in the south central portion of the state. For the next , US 212 passes through a series of small cities in this area: Sacred Heart, Renville, Danube, and Olivia. In Olivia, the county seat of Renville County, US 212 meets US 71. US 212 continues due east through more farmland, again passing through a series of small cities that developed along the route. Through the next  of the road, US 212 goes through Bird Island, Hector (intersecting MN 4), Buffalo Lake, Stewart and Brownton (intersecting MN 15). Brownton, which is located on Buffalo Creek, is the site of the Sioux Uprising, one of the earliest massacres of white settlers in the region. Several miles later, US 212 is joined by MN 22; US 212 becomes a four-lane divided highway heading east into the city of Glencoe closely following Buffalo Creek. MN 22 splits off to the north in downtown Glencoe, while US 212 heads east out of the city.

Glencoe to the Twin Cities area
East of Glencoe, the terrain becomes progressively more hilly as US 212 continues eastward. US 212 is joined by MN 5 and MN 25 about  after leaving Glencoe. After leaving Norwood Young America, US 212 becomes a two-lane road, passing by several lakes, continuing east for several miles to the city of Cologne. It then runs into the community of Dahlgren. East of Dahlgren, US 212 becomes a freeway as it heads into the Twin Cities area. The freeway runs along the northwest upland of the Minnesota River valley.

After the first interchange on the freeway with Jonathan Carver Parkway, US 212 enters the city limits of Chaska. The road then curves to the north. It has an interchange with Big Woods Boulevard that was constructed in late 2019. It crosses over Chaska Creek, and has an interchange with Engler Boulevard before turning northeastward. The freeway meets with MN 41. Less than  later, the freeway enters the city of Chanhassen, where it has two interchanges and passes by several lakes. US 212 then crosses into Hennepin County and into the city of Eden Prairie. The overlap with MN 5 ends at the cloverleaf interchange with Interstate 494 (I-494). At the boundary between Eden Prairie and Edina, US 212 parallels MN 62, and the two highways have a junction with US 169. US 212 officially ends at the eastern limit of this interchange in Edina, where eastbound US 212 merges into eastbound MN 62. MN 62 continues the roadway into the city of Minneapolis.

History

Auto trails

Most of the route of present-day US 212 between Montevideo and Norwood Young America was originally designated as part of the transcontinental auto trail known as the Yellowstone Trail, which was conceived in 1912. The Yellowstone Trail stretched from Seattle, Washington, via Yellowstone National Park, to Plymouth, Massachusetts. The auto trail route in Minnesota was officially recognized by the Minnesota Highway Department in 1917. East of Norwood Young America, the Yellowstone Trail utilized MN 5, shifting to Excelsior Boulevard via the Minnewashta Parkway to reach Minneapolis. West of Montevideo, the Yellowstone Trail used present day MN 7 to US 12.

The westernmost section of present-day US 212, from the South Dakota line to Montevideo, was also part of another auto trail known as the Short Cut West Highway. This auto trail went on a direct route between Minneapolis and Yellowstone National Park. The Yellowstone Trail also connects Minneapolis with Yellowstone National Park but travels a longer, more circuitous route through many populated centers. Between Montevideo and the Twin Cities area, the Short Cut West Highway ran along MN 7 until Lake Minnewashta, where it ended at the Yellowstone Trail.

Designation as a U.S. Highway
In 1926, the United States Numbered Highway System was implemented in the country. US 212 was originally designated as a route that connected US 85 in Belle Fourche, South Dakota, with US 12 in Willmar, Minnesota. In 1934, US 212 was extended east to Saint Paul along mostly its modern alignment. In the Twin Cities area, US 212 utilized Flying Cloud Drive and Vernon Avenue to reach Excelsior Boulevard. It then followed Lake Street through Minneapolis, crossing the Mississippi River into Saint Paul and becoming Marshall Avenue and finally ending at then US 12 in downtown Saint Paul. In 1983, US 212 was truncated to end at US 169 in Edina, disconnecting US 212 from US 12, its parent route.

Construction
The paving of US 212 in Minnesota began in 1928 and the route was completely paved by 1940. The earliest sections to be paved were the roads east of MN 15, which was paved by 1929. The portion of the route in Renville County was paved by 1931, while the portion between US 75 and Granite Falls was paved between 1932 and 1934. The portion west of US 75 had originally been a county road and was only added to the state highway system in 1934. Paving of this section was finished in 1938. The portion that overlapped MN 5 was paved by 1940.

Over the next few decades, several sections of the road were reconstructed as four-lane divided highways. The four-lane road between Glencoe and Norwood Young America was completed in 1959. The expressway approach in the vicinity of I-494 was completed by 1971. Several other segments were reconstructed in 1990, namely the old Flying Cloud Drive alignment, which became a four-lane divided surface arterial, and the MN 5 overlap, which became an expressway.

A four-way stop sign in Glencoe is located within the  expressway segment of the route. Counties and cities along US 212 are lobbying to extend the four-lane divided highway west of Glencoe. The Minnesota Department of Transportation (MnDOT) is considering the proposal.

From Hector to MN 22 near Glencoe, the route is planned to be reconstructed with passing lanes.

MN 312

Between Eden Prairie and Chaska, US 212 was relocated in July 2008 to a new, more northerly,  freeway alignment. During planning and construction, the new freeway was given the temporary designation of MN 312.

On April 29, 2002, former U.S. Transportation Secretary Norman Mineta was in the Twin Cities for an announcement regarding transportation in Minnesota. Mineta presented a $2.9 million check (Federal Highway Administration grant) to state transportation officials. The $2.9 million is part of the $238 million funding for the new  freeway alignment of US 212 in Eden Prairie, Chanhassen, and Chaska. The groundbreaking celebration on August 20, 2005, was held in Chaska.

On December 7, 2007, a  portion of the project from Dell Road in Eden Prairie to MN 41 in Chaska opened to traffic, giving drivers use of about half of the new freeway alignment. It was signed using its temporary designation of MN 312. On July 14, 2008, the remaining portion of the project from MN 41 to just west of Carver opened to traffic. The new freeway has a designated shoulder on both sides for a planned bus rapid transit route extending from Carver to points eastward along the freeway.

Soon after the completion of MN 312, the MN 312 route designation was retired and US 212 was relocated onto the new freeway. The former surface alignment of US 212 along Flying Cloud Drive was turned back to the maintenance of Carver and Hennepin counties as County Road 61.

Major intersections

References

External links

Highway 212 in Minnesota - new freeway alignment website (MnDOT)

12-2
2 in Minnesota
Transportation in Lac qui Parle County, Minnesota
Transportation in Chippewa County, Minnesota
Transportation in Yellow Medicine County, Minnesota
Transportation in Renville County, Minnesota
Transportation in McLeod County, Minnesota
Transportation in Carver County, Minnesota
Transportation in Hennepin County, Minnesota